The Voice Kids Indonesia is an Indonesian music talent show for young singers, based on the concept of the show The Voice Indonesia. The first broadcast was on August 26, 2016, on GTV (formerly Global TV). The show has currently aired three seasons from 2016 to 2018. The fourth season was in 2021, scheduled after a two-year break. As of 2022, a fifth season has yet to be confirmed.

Format

Blind Auditions 
For the Blind Auditions, each contestant takes the stage individually and sings to an audience and a panel of judges who have their chairs turned away from the singers. In a blind audition, only the judges make the decision on the quality of the contestant's voice. However, the studio audience are listening in on the performance as are viewers of the TV show. If the judge likes the contestant's voice, they will hit the "I WANT YOU" button which makes their chair rotate to face the stage. Contestants selected by more than one judge must choose a judge to accompany them to the next round. If no judges hit the "I WANT YOU" button, the contestants do not move to the next round.

Battle Rounds  
Three singers compete by singing individually, and the coach chooses a winner. Winners advance to the Sing Off. Contestants that do not win are eliminated.

Sing Off 
All artists who advanced from the battle rounds will sing a song on the sing-off. In each team, only four acts shall be chosen to go to the semifinals.

Live Shows 
Each contestant will sing 'live' in front of the coach and viewers. In the semifinals, the entire Indonesian audience will determine which contestants will proceed to the next round through the voting system.

Grand Final 
This round is the final round that will determine the champion of The Voice Kids Indonesia.

Coaches and hosts

Coaches

Hosts 

 Legend
 Featured as a main host.
 Featured as a backstage host.
 Featured as an online host.
 Featured as a guest host.

Coaches' advisors

Coaches' teams 
  Winning coach/contestant
  Runner-up coach/contestant
  Second runner-up coach/contestant

notes : 
Winners are in bold
Finalists are in italic
Eliminated contestants are in small font

Series overview
Warning: the following table presents a significant amount of different colors.

References

Indonesian reality television series
Singing competitions
2016 Indonesian television series debuts
GTV (Indonesian TV network) original programming
Television series about children
Television series about teenagers